Uptown is the third and final studio album from Australian synthpop band Machinations. The album was released in October 1988 and peaked at number 50 on the ARIA Charts.

Track listing

Charts

References

1988 albums
Machinations (band) albums
Mushroom Records albums